NordArt is an international contemporary art exhibition and a non-profit cultural initiative of the ACO Group and the cities of Büdelsdorf and Rendsburg. It has taken place annually in the summer since 1999 at Carlshütte, a former iron foundry. The site features 22,000 m² of interior space and 60,000 m² for outdoor installations.

NordArt Prizes 
In 2010, NordArt began awarding the NordArt Prize and the NordArt Public Choice Award. All award recipients are invited to participate again in NordArt the year after their win.

The NordArt Prize 
Sponsored by Johanna and Hans-Julius Ahlmann, the NordArt Prize is awarded each year to one artist. The artist selected receives an endowment of 10,000 euros.

Previous NordArt Prize Winners

 2010: Zeng Chenggang (China) 
 2011: Peter Lundberg (USA) 
 2012: Gheorghi Filin (Bulgaria / Italy) 
 2013: SINN (South Korea) and Wolfgang Gramm (Germany) 
 2014: AES+F (Tatiana Arzamasova, Lev Evzovitch, Evgeny Svyatsky + Vladimir Fridkes) (Russia) 
 2015: Liu Yonggang (China)
 2017: Jörg Plickat (Germany)
 2018: Michal Gabriel (Czech Republic)

The NordArt Public Choice Award 
The Public Choice Award is based upon votes from NordArt visitors. A prize of 1,000 euros is awarded to the top three artists.

Previous Audience Award Winners

2010

 1st place - Teija and Pekka Isorättyä (Finland)
 2nd place - Wolfgang Stiller (Berlin)
 3rd place - Hiroko

2011

 1st place - Dan Hudson (Canada)
 2nd place - Gerhard Mantz (Germany)
 3rd place - Zdeněk Šmíd (Czech Republic)

2012

 1st place - Gilles T. Lacombe (France)
 2nd place - Zhi XinXin (China)
 3rd place - SINN (Korea)

2013

 1st place - Jovanka Stanojević (Serbia)
 2nd place - Villu Jaanisoo (Estonia / Finland)
 3rd place - Soon Mi Oh (South Korea)

2014 

 1st Prize - Confronting Anitya - China Garden (China)
 2nd Prize - Jovanka Stanojević (Serbia)
 3rd prize - Dmitry Gutov (Russia)

2015 

 1st place - Jang Yongsun (South Korea)
 2nd place - Lv Shun (China)
 3rd place - Ochirbold Ayurzana (Mongolia)

2016

 1st prize - Liu Ruowang (China)
 2nd Prize - Talia Keinan (Israel)
 3rd Prize - Jo Kley (Germany)

2017 

 1st place - Xu Bing (China)
 2nd place - Varol Topaç (Turkey)
 3rd place - David Černý (Czech Republic)

2018 

 1st Prize - Xiang Jing (China)
 2nd Prize - Zhang Dali (China)
 3rd Prize - Ekaterina Zacharova (Russia)

References

External links
 NordArt Official Site
 Kunstwerk Carlshütte Official Site
 Nordart: Great art in a small town

German art